Datooli is a village in Bhojpura patwar circle in Phagi Tehsil in Jaipur district, Rajasthan.

In Datooli, there are 220 households with total population of 1,322 (with 50.38% males and 49.62% females), based on 2011 census. Total area of village is 7.99 km2. There is one primary school in Datooli village.

References

Villages in Jaipur district